The Roman Catholic Diocese of Gulbarga in India was created on 24 June 2005. It is a suffragan diocese of the Archdiocese of Bangalore. Its first bishop is Rev. Robert Miranda. The parish church Mother Mary of Divine Grace in Gulbarga will be the cathedral for the diocese. It was the 150th diocese of India, and the 120th of Latin Rite.

The diocese covers an area of 38,752 km² of the Karnataka state previously belonging to the Archdiocese of Hyderabad and the dioceses of Bellary and Belgaum.

The total population in the diocese is 7,012,492, of which 6,425 are Catholic. The diocese is subdivided into 16 parishes.

External links
Official Website of the Diocese 
GCatholic.org
Catholic-hierarchy.org
Vatican press release on the creation 
Websites Links at CBCI

Roman Catholic dioceses in India
Christian organizations established in 2005
Roman Catholic dioceses and prelatures established in the 21st century
2005 establishments in Karnataka
Christianity in Karnataka
Kalaburagi